The Bishop of Killaloe is an episcopal title which takes its name after the town of Killaloe in County Clare, Ireland. In the Roman Catholic Church it remains a separate title, but in the Church of Ireland it has been united with other bishoprics.

History
The Diocese of Killaloe was one of the twenty-four dioceses established at the Synod of Rathbreasail in 1111. The boundaries of the diocese consisted of almost all of County Clare, the northern part of County Tipperary and the western part of County Offaly. Its Irish name is Cill-da-lua (Church of Lua), so named from St Mo Lua, an abbot who lived in the late 6th century. At the Synod of Kells in March 1152, Killaloe some lost territory when the dioceses of Kilfenora, Roscrea and Scattery Island were created.

Following the Reformation, there are now parallel Killaloe dioceses: one of the Church of Ireland and the other of the Roman Catholic Church.

 In Church of Ireland
The pre-Reformation Cathedral Church of St Flannan, Killaloe continued as the Church of Ireland bishop's seat (cathedra). The Church of Ireland title was united with Kilfenora in 1752, and again with Clonfert & Kilmacduagh in 1834. Since 1976, it has been part of the united bishopric of Limerick and Killaloe.

 In the Roman Catholic Church
The Roman Catholic bishop's seat is located at St Peter and St Paul Cathedral in Ennis, County Clare. The current bishop of the Roman Catholic Diocese of Killaloe is the Most Reverend Fintan Monahan who succeeded on 25 September 2016.

Pre-Reformation bishops

Post-Reformation bishops

Church of Ireland bishops

Roman Catholic succession

Notes
 There is some doubt as to whether Ua Conaing  and Ua Lonngargáin  were Bishop of Killaloe as well as Archbishop of Cashel at the time of their death.
 Turlough O'Brien was bishop of both successions.

References

External links

 St. Flannan first bishop of Killaloe; List of the Bishops of Diocese of Killaloe
 List of the Protestant Bishops of Killaloe

Killaloe
Killaloe
Religion in County Clare
Killaloe
Bishops of Killaloe
Anglican bishops of Killaloe
Roman Catholic bishops of Killaloe